Straight Talking is a novel by British author Jane Green.  It was published in the United States in 2003.

Synopsis

Anastasia, or "Tasha," is a thirty-year-old English woman working as a television producer in London.  She is perpetually single and has had few long-term relationships.  She and her girlfriends regularly meet and commiserate over the troubles of modern dating.  Tasha's insecurities in regards to men and dating stem from her longest relationship, with a man named Simon, that ended abruptly when Simon revealed that he had been unfaithful.  In addition, it is revealed that Tasha's father had had multiple affairs during Tasha's youth, one of which she discovered herself.  Tasha engages in brief affairs with men, concerned primarily with their physical attractiveness.  One day she meets a handsome, dashing man named Andrew, but avoids being seduced by him.

Days later Tasha is preparing to go to dinner with her best platonic male friend, Adam, whom she met years earlier as a mutual friend of Simon.  Adam and Tasha are very close.  Since Andrew is also a friend of Adam, Tasha invites Andrew to dinner with them.  During the meal she is attracted to Andrew, much to the chagrin of Adam.

Shortly thereafter Tasha is invited to dinner once more with Adam, who reveals his true feelings for her.  Tasha is taken aback and does not know how to respond.  She feels that, though she "loves" Adam, she is not "in love" with him.  Immediately, she seeks the counsel of her girlfriends.  The advice is, as always, mixed:  Some support the idea that she should try to have a romantic relationship with Adam, who has always been trustworthy and a good friend, while others feel that there must be "passion" - something Adam lacks.

Tasha tentatively begins a relationship with Adam, which quickly progresses.  Eventually she invites him to move in with her, but soon begins questioning her decision.  As Adam begins moving in, moving his things to her home carload by carload, Tasha is surprised at home by Andrew, who has arrived there to wait for Adam.  Consumed by sudden lust, Tasha begins kissing Andrew, only to realize that Adam had returned and seen them.  She hears his Saab racing off and Andrew departs in shame, both he and Tasha horrified at what they had done.

The girlfriends again offer mixed advice, with some encouraging Tasha to seek Adam's forgiveness and others asserting that she must find a new suitor whom she is passionate about...like Andrew.  After a brief hesitation Tasha decides to seduce Andrew and attempt a "passionate" relationship.  She lures him to a hotel under the pretense of discussing her breakup with Adam and, after drinks at the hotel bar, guides him to her hotel room.  At the last moment, however, she is unable to go through with the impending sex and, disgusted, Andrew leaves.  Tasha immediately begins trying to reconcile with Adam, whom she now knows she loves and misses terribly.

Eventually Adam agrees to attempt a reconciliation, and the book ends on an optimistic note as Tasha vows to win back his trust.

Reception

The book received mixed reviews compared to other Jane Green novels. Though Straight Talking had been written first it was not published in the United States until after her other books had achieved critical and commercial success.  Many fans praised the fast pace and considered it an "honest" look at modern women and dating, while most detractors criticized Tasha as being an unrealistic and unsympathetic narrator.

Sources

Green, J. (2003).  Straight Talking:  A Novel.  New York:  Broadway Books

References

2003 novels
Novels set in London